The 1972 Michigan State Spartans football team represented Michigan State University in the 1972 Big Ten Conference football season. In their 19th season under head coach Duffy Daugherty, the Spartans compiled a 5–5–1 overall record (5–2–1 against Big Ten opponents) and finished in fourth place in the Big Ten Conference.

Five Spartans were selected by either the Associated Press (AP) or the United Press International (UPI) as first-team players on the 1972 All-Big Ten Conference football team: tight end Billy Joe Dupree (AP-2, UPI-1); offensive guard Joe DeLamielleure (AP-1, UPI-1); linebacker Gail Clark (AP-1, UPI-1); and defensive backs Bill Simpson (AP-1, UPI-1) and Brad Van Pelt (AP-1, UPI-1).

On November 3, 1972, Duffy Daugherty announced that he would resign as Michigan State's head football coach at the end of the 1972 season. In 19 years as the head coach, he compiled a 109–69–5 record and won two Big Ten championships. Denny Stolz, who had been the Spartans' defensive coordinator for two years, was hired in December 1972 to replace Daugherty.

Schedule

Personnel
 LB No. 98 Gail Clark, Sr.

Game summaries

Michigan

    
    

On October 14, 1972, Michigan State lost to Michigan, 10–0, in front of a crowd of 103,735 at Michigan Stadium. The game was Michigan's first shutout victory over Michigan State since 1947. Michigan scored on a 22-yard field goal by Mike Lantry in the second quarter and a 58-yard touchdown run by Gil Chapman in the fourth quarter. The Wolverines totaled 334 rushing yards, including 107 by Ed Shuttlesworth, 81 by Chuck Heater, and 64 by Dennis Franklin. The Spartans had a 24-yard touchdown run called back due to a clipping penalty, and their only other scoring threat ended when a hit from Dave Brown forced the Spartans' ball carrier to fumble into the end zone.

References

Michigan State
Michigan State Spartans football seasons
Michigan State Spartans football